is an action role-playing game developed by Artoon and Mistwalker for the Nintendo DS. The story involves a curse called "Away", which causes a person to mysteriously vanish from a village each year.

Gameplay 
The main gameplay focus of Away is its "shuffle dungeons", where both DS screens show a part of the dungeon for the player to explore in. When a player enters a dungeon, they are given a few seconds to move Sword around both screens before a part of the dungeon starts to shift and reveal a different area for the player to battle monsters and open treasure chests. If a player dwells too much time in one of the dungeon's areas, they'll get caught in the shuffle and will lose a portion of their HP and start over in the dungeon before the previous one where they got shifted. After reaching the final floor of a dungeon, they'll either face a boss or collect gold or items from treasure chests and access a save point. Once the player exits through the way they came from the dungeon, they'll be able to use that dungeon again to raise their stats and open chests.

Development
Away: Shuffle Dungeon was co-developed by Artoon and Mistwalker and published in Japan by AQ Interactive. Instead of handing off the western localization to AQ's subsidiary Xseed Games as earlier reported, the game was published in North America by Majesco Entertainment. AQ Interactive and Virgin Play entered into a partnership for its European release, translating the game into German, English, Spanish, French and Italian.

Reception 

The game received "mixed" reviews according to the review aggregation website Metacritic. Game Informer gave it a favorable review nearly two months before it was released Stateside. GameSpot said the gameplay was too simple and easy. In Japan, Famitsu gave it a score of two eights, one seven, and one eight for a total of 31 out of 40.

References

External links 
  
 

2008 video games
Action role-playing video games
AQ Interactive games
Artoon games
Majesco Entertainment games
Mistwalker games
Multiplayer and single-player video games
Nintendo DS games
Nintendo DS-only games
Role-playing video games
Video games developed in Japan
Video games scored by Nobuo Uematsu